Interstate 787 (I-787) is an auxiliary Interstate Highway in the US state of New York. I-787 is the main highway for those traveling into and out of downtown Albany. The southern terminus is, per New York traffic data, at the toll plaza for New York State Thruway (I-87) exit 23 southwest of downtown Albany. However, current signage indicates the terminus as along I-787's ramp to US Route 9W (US 9W). The northern terminus of the route is unclear, with some sources placing the terminus at 8th Street in Troy, creating an overlap with New York State Route 7 (NY 7) between Green Island and Troy. Other documents show I-787 as terminating at its interchange with NY 7 and NY 787 in the town of Colonie.

North of NY 7, I-787 continues north as NY 787 to the city of Cohoes.

Route description

I-787 officially begins at the toll barrier for I-87/Thruway exit 23; however, a short  spur between US 9W and the interchange connecting I-787 to the Thruway, designated as New York State Route 912S (NY 912S), an unsigned reference route, is signed as I-787. At the east end of the interchange (exit 1) with I-87, I-787 northbound merges with NY 912S, progressing due east for a short distance before curving to the northeast ahead of the Delaware and Hudson Railway mainline near exit 2 (NY 32). Past NY 32, I-787 parallels the Hudson River as it heads northward into the heart of downtown Albany, featuring a pair of exits with US 9 and US 20 at a massive interchange southeast of the Empire State Plaza on the west bank of the Hudson.

North of downtown Albany, I-787 interchanges with I-90 at exit 5 prior to crossing into Menands and meeting NY 32 once more at exit 6 by way of a trumpet interchange. The ramp from the trumpet to NY 32, a  roadway, is designated as unsigned NY 913T. Farther north in Menands, I-787 intersects NY 378 (exit 7) by way of a partial cloverleaf interchange. In Watervliet, I-787 has one interchange with 23rd Street (exit 8) before reaching another partial cloverleaf interchange with NY 7 and NY 787 (exit 9) in Green Island. 

I-787's alignment after exit 9 is unclear. Appendix E of the 2008 New York State Department of Transportation (NYSDOT) Traffic Data Report places the terminus at 8th Street in Troy, creating an overlap with NY 7 across the Hudson River via the Collar City Bridge. Additionally, there are shields for I-787 on the Collar City Bridge east of the Hudson River. Other sources, including the National Highway System map of Albany published by the Federal Highway Administration (FHWA) and NYSDOT's official description of signed routes in New York State, identifies the terminus as the NY 7/NY 787 interchange near Green Island. Contemporary maps of the Albany area also lack I-787 shields on the Collar City Bridge, signing the roadway only as NY 7.

History

Construction began in the early 1960s on the first segment of I-787 from I-87 to Bassett Street. It was completed and opened to traffic in the mid-1960s. By 1968, construction had begun on the remainder of I-787 south of Watervliet. The portion of the highway between I-90 and NY 378 was completed by 1971; the rest of I-787 south of 23rd Street in Watervliet was built and open to traffic by 1973. The ramps from the South Mall Arterial were opened in 1974. An extension of the freeway north to Arch Street near Green Island was completed by 1977. By 1980, the majority of modern exit 9 was completed even though the Collar City Bridge and the "Alternate Route 7" freeway had yet to be constructed. The Collar City Bridge over the Hudson River was built in 1981, connecting the preexisting ramps at exit 9 to downtown Troy.

When I-787 was first planned, its northern terminus was at US 4 in Troy. On January 1, 1970, the I-787 designation was truncated westward to what is now exit 9 near Green Island while the then-proposed Collar City Bridge became (albeit on paper) part of I-88, a new highway extending from Binghamton to Troy by way of the Susquehanna Expressway and Alternate Route 7. The extension of I-88 never materialized as Alternate Route 7 ended up becoming a realignment of NY 7 when it was completed in the 1980s.

In 2005, an elevated section of the northbound exit 3 offramp slipped off its supports, causing temporary closure of the ramp and causing disruption of the flow of traffic into the Empire State Plaza. The ramp connects I-787 with the South Mall Arterial. Initially, most roads and ramps near or under the elevated highway were closed, but, once temporary piers were in place, most roads reopened. A detour was set up to allow northbound traffic to enter the plaza, but it required crossing the Hudson River over the Dunn Memorial Bridge and traveling through the city of Rensselaer to get back on the bridge, allowing access into the plaza. Nobody was seriously injured by the slipped ramp.

Future 
In 2016, New York Assemblymember Patricia Fahy advocated for I-787 to be demolished and to be replaced with an at-grade highway to improve traffic and access to the waterfront. In December 2019, Fahy "announced plans to introduce legislation calling for the state Department of Transportation to conduct an engineering feasibility study that would assess the replacement or modification of I-787 to provide greater access to Albany's waterfront and revitalize working class communities located along its route". According to Fahy, "The Capital Region's greatest asset—access to the Hudson River waterfront—has been more or less absent from communities including downtown Albany since the late 1960s and early 1970s when I-787 went up [...]. Following announcements of the removal of several similar highways in cities throughout the state, conducting an engineering feasibility study will provide a blueprint and cost estimates for either removing or transforming I-787 into a boulevard-style roadway".

In March 2018, New York Governor Andrew Cuomo announced that his administration had awarded $3.1 million (equivalent to $ in ) toward the conversion of a little-used I-787 exit ramp into a park called the Albany Skyway. The park, which connects downtown Albany to the Hudson River waterfront, opened on April 29, 2022.

The Regional Economic Development Council initiated the Albany Skyway project with a $350,000 (equivalent to $ in ) grant in 2016. With funding from federal grants, city revitalization funds, and a $3.1-million (equivalent to $ in ) NYSDOT award, the city enacted a plan to deconstruct parts of I-787 and create a multiuse design. The half-mile Albany Skyway path, completed in 2022, links the downtown area of Albany with the Hudson River waterfront nature preserve. As a form of community equitable planning, the skyway aims to provide equal opportunities to access natural space, in the form of a park for underserved areas in the city.

In March 2018, a draft report was released regarding the findings of an I-787/Hudson Waterfront Corridor Study. The study was prepared for the Capital District Transportation Committee. The draft report set forth various recommendations for improvements to I-787, including "reconfiguring some interchanges, making the waterfront more accessible to bicyclists and pedestrians, converting from an expressway to a more traditional roadway, and pursuing strategies to reduce travel demand". The draft report noted that 88,000 vehicles per day travel into downtown Albany on I-787. It also noted that the report did not recommend significant changes, such as making I-787 into an underground highway or removing it altogether; such ideas would be complicated by railroad tracks in the I-787 median and by the fact that I-787 is located in a flood plain. Released in May 2019, the final report detailed various possible future plans for I-787. Those potential future plans included the conversion of the entirety of the Interstate to an at-grade urban arterial.

Exit list

See also

 New York State Route 787 for grade level intersections to the north.
 New York State Route 910F (Fuller Road Alternate), which was intended to connect to I-787 at I-87 and US 9W

References

External links

 Capital Highways - I-787 (Chris Jordan)

87-7
87-7
7
Transportation in Albany, New York
Transportation in Rensselaer County, New York
Transportation in Albany County, New York
1960s establishments in New York (state)